Old Webster Schoolhouse, also known as Markleeville Schoolhouse is located at 135 School St., Markleeville, in Alpine County, California.

It was a meeting hall and school and, in 2005, when it was listed on the National Register of Historic Places was a museum.

The building is now part of the Alpine County Museum, a complex which includes the restored one-room schoolhouse, the museum, a log jail and a silver ore stamp mill.  The museum is operated by the Alpine County Historical Society and is open seasonally.

References

External links
 Alpine County Museum
 Wayside Marker - photos

School buildings on the National Register of Historic Places in California
Buildings and structures in Alpine County, California
One-room schoolhouses in California
Schools in Alpine County, California
National Register of Historic Places in Alpine County, California